Tiquanny Williams (born 10 September 2001) is a Saint Kitts and Nevis association footballer who currently plays for A.D. Ovarense, and the Saint Kitts and Nevis national team.

Club career
Williams won the Keith Gumbs Youth Player of the Year award presented by the Saint Kitts and Nevis Football Association in 2018 while playing for St Thomas/Trinity Strikers FC. The award was presented by CONCACAF president Victor Montagliani. The same year he was named the nation's High School Male Footballer of the Year as a student at Verchilds High School. 

Williams has played for United Old Road Jets FC of the SKNFA Premier League since 2018. Through the 2021 season, he made 53 league appearances, scoring 34 goals. Towards the end of the 2021 season, he was leading the league's golden boot race.

In February 2022 Williams joined A.D. Ovarense of Portugal’s  Aveiro Football League.

International career
Williams made five appearances for Saint Kitts and Nevis in the 2018 CONCACAF U-20 Championship. In October 2018 he represented the under-20 team again in the Youth International Series hosted by the Barbados Football Association. He scored his team's second goal in an eventual 2–2 draw with the hosts in the opening match of the tournament. 

He made his senior international debut on 8 June 2021 in a 2022 FIFA World Cup qualification match against Trinidad and Tobago.

International career statistics

References

External links
 
 
 SKFA profile
 FPF profile

Living people
2001 births
Association football midfielders
People from Basseterre
Saint Kitts and Nevis footballers
Saint Kitts and Nevis international footballers
Saint Kitts and Nevis under-20 international footballers